The Last Word is a 2009 Iranian film, directed and produced by Hossein Shahabi.

Starring
 Pourang Makvandi
 Ali Habibpoor
 Shima Nikpour
 Hossein Alizâdeh
 Reza Abdollahi (actor)
 Mohammad Baghban
 Vahid Azadi
 Hossein Hatef

References

External links
 
 mehrnews hossein shahabi films

2009 films
Iranian short films
Films directed by Hossein Shahabi